Mezza can refer to:

 Meze, small dishes in Middle Eastern cuisine
 Italian meaning half (see masculine form mezzo), particularly in musical terms
 Mezza voce, half-voiced singing technique